DaShaun Amos (born September 20, 1994) is a professional gridiron football defensive back for the Toronto Argonauts of the Canadian Football League (CFL). He played college football for the East Carolina.

College career
A member of the 2012 recruiting class, Amos redshirted his first season at ECU. He appeared in 49 games recording 116 tackles and 11 passes defended.

Professional career

New York Giants
Amos was signed as an undrafted free agent by the New York Giants of the National Football League (NFL) on May 3, 2017. He played in all four pre-season games for the Giants, but was released with the final roster cuts on September 2, 2017.

Calgary Stampeders
On October 3, 2018, Amos signed with the Calgary Stampeders of the CFL to a practice roster agreement. He played in his first professional regular season game on October 13, 2018 against the BC Lions in place of the injured Brandon Smith. He played in one other regular season game before returning to the practice roster for the remainder of the season while the Stampeders won the 106th Grey Cup championship.

Amos was re-signed by the Stampeders in the off-season on December 10, 2018 and made the team's active roster following the team's 2019 training camp. He played and started in 17 regular season games where he recorded 42 defensive tackles and five interceptions. He scored his first professional career touchdown after returning a Logan Kilgore interception 79 yards for the score on September 7, 2019 against the Edmonton Eskimos. In his first full CFL season, he was named a West Division All-Star.

Green Bay Packers
On January 15, 2020, Amos signed a reserve/future contract with the Green Bay Packers of the NFL. He was waived on September 5, 2020. Amos was selected by the Aviators of The Spring League during its player selection draft on October 12, 2020.

Calgary Stampeders (II)
On February 1, 2021, it was announced that Amos had re-signed with the Calgary Stampeders to a one-year contract.

Toronto Argonauts
On February 8, 2022, it was announced that Amos had signed with the Toronto Argonauts.

References

External links
East Carolina bio
Toronto Argonauts bio 

1994 births
Living people
American football defensive backs
Calgary Stampeders players
Canadian football defensive backs
East Carolina Pirates football players
Green Bay Packers players
New York Giants players
People from Midlothian, Virginia
Players of American football from Virginia
The Spring League players
Toronto Argonauts players